St. Charles Lwanga Buikwe Hospital, also Czech–Slovak–Ugandan Hospital, is a community hospital in the Central Region of Uganda. It is affiliated with the Uganda Catholic Medical Bureau.

Location
The coordinates of the hospital are 0°20'21.0"N, 33°01'56.0"E (Latitude:0.339170; Longitude:33.032229).

Overview
The hospital is a joint venture between the Roman Catholic Archdiocese of Prague in the Czech Republic and the Roman Catholic Diocese of Lugazi in Uganda. The hospital opened in February 2007, following two years of construction. It has several departments including pediatrics, surgery, internal medicine, gynecology and maternity. It is majority funded by donations from the Czech Republic. The hospital also serves as the teaching hospital for the Johnass International College of Health Sciences located in the town of Njeru.

Hospital operations
As of December 2019, the hospital attended to 19,491 outpatients annually on average. There were 5,579 inpatient admissions annually, on average, with a bed occupancy ratio of 80 percent.
St. Charles Lwanga Buikwe Hospital averaged 804 maternal deliveries every year with a caesarean section rate of 20.7 percent. At that time, patient user fees accounted for 11.5 percent of total hospital income, on average.

See also
List of hospitals in Uganda

References

External links
 Website of Uganda Ministry of Health
 Uganda: Buikwe Determined to Save More Lives

Hospitals in Uganda
Buikwe District
Central Region, Uganda
Hospital buildings completed in 2007
2007 establishments in Uganda
Teaching hospitals in Uganda
Catholic hospitals in Africa